The Cameroon national women's football team, also known as the Indomitable Lionesses, is the national team of Cameroon and is controlled by the Cameroon Football Association. They finished second in the 1991, 2004, 2014, and 2016 Africa Women Cup of Nations, participated in the 2012 Olympic Games and have competed in their first ever FIFA Women's World Cup in 2015.

History

Team image

Home stadium
The Cameroon women's national football team plays their home matches on the Stade Ahmadou Ahidjo.

Overall competitive record

1 Equatorial Guinea was disqualified from the competition for fielding an ineligible player, so Cameroon advanced to the final qualifying round instead.

Results and fixtures

The following is a list of match results in the last 12 months, as well as any future matches that have been scheduled.

Legend

2022

2023

Source:global archive

Coaching staff

Current coaching staff

Manager history

   Carl Enow (2003–2018)
  Alain Djeumfa (????–2022)
 Gabriel Zabo (2022–present)

Players

Current squad
 The following 25 players were called up for the 2023 FIFA Women's World Cup qualification (inter-confederation play-offs).
 Match dates: 18 February 2023
 Opposition: 
 Caps and goals correct as of: 17 July 2022, after the match against

Recent call-ups
 The following players were named to a Cameroon squad in the last 12 months.
This list may be incomplete.

}}

}}

}}
}}
}}
}}
}}

}}
}}

}}

Previous squads
FIFA Women's World Cup
 2015 FIFA Women's World Cup squad
 2019 FIFA Women's World Cup squad
Summer Olympics
 2012 Summer Olympics squad
Africa Women Cup of Nations
2000 African Women's Championship squad
2010 African Women's Championship squad
2012 African Women's Championship squad
2014 African Women's Championship squad
2016 Africa Women Cup of Nations squad
2018 Africa Women Cup of Nations squad
2022 Africa Women Cup of Nations squad

Captains

Christine Manie (????–)

Honours

Regional
COSAFA Women's Championship
  Runners-up: 2018

Competitive record

FIFA Women's World Cup

*Draws include knockout matches decided on penalty kicks.

Olympic Games
For 2012 Cameroon qualified for the first time to the Olympics.

Africa Women Cup of Nations

African Games

UNIFFAC Women's Cup

Honours

All−time record against FIFA recognized nations
The list shown below shows the Djibouti national football team all−time international record against opposing nations.
*As of xxxxxx after match against xxxx.
Key

Record per opponent
*As ofxxxxx after match against xxxxx.
Key

The following table shows Djibouti's all-time official international record per opponent:

See also

 Sport in Cameroon
 Football in Cameroon
 Women's football in Cameroon
 Cameroon women's national under-20 football team
 Cameroon women's national under-17 football team
 Cameroon men's national football team

References

External links
 Official website
 FIFA profile, FIFA.com 

 
Football in Cameroon
African women's national association football teams